Huampuni (possibly from Aymara wampu boat, -ni a suffix, "the one with a boat") is a  mountain in the Vilcanota mountain range in the Andes of Peru. It is located in the Cusco Region, Canchis Province, Pitumarca District. Huampuni lies southwest of Sibinacocha. It is situated at the bank of the Yanamayo, a left tributary of the Chillcamayu whose waters flow to the Vilcanota River.

References

Mountains of Peru
Mountains of Cusco Region
Lakes of Peru
Lakes of Cusco Region